Cross Team Legendre is a French professional cyclo-cross team established in 2015. The team was founded by Steve Chainel and Lucie Chainel-Lefèvre before the start of the 2015–2016 cyclo-cross season, and gained UCI Cyclo-cross Pro Team status in 2017.

Team roster

References

External links

Cycling teams established in 2015
2015 establishments in France
Cycling teams based in France